Helen Victoria Baxendale (born 7 June 1970) is an English actress of stage and television, known for her roles as Rachel Bradley in the British comedy drama Cold Feet (1997–2003), and Emily Waltham in the American sitcom Friends (1998–1999).

Baxendale's early stage credits include The Soldiers at Glasgow's Citizens Theatre, which earned her a 1993 Ian Charleson Award nomination. Her other television credits include Cardiac Arrest (1994–1996), An Unsuitable Job for a Woman (1997–1999), Adrian Mole: The Cappuccino Years (2001), Cuckoo (2012–2019), and Noughts + Crosses (2020).

Early life
Baxendale was born on 7 June 1970 in Pontefract, West Riding of Yorkshire. Baxendale's parents were teachers at a comprehensive school, her sister is the screenwriter Katie Baxendale.

She grew up in Shenstone, Staffordshire, and attended King Edward VI School, Lichfield. She wanted to be a ballet dancer and trained at the Elmhurst School for Dance, until dropping out aged 17 in favour of an acting career. She moved to the Bristol Old Vic Theatre School, then worked at the Glasgow Citizens' Theatre from 1992 to 1995.

Career

Television
Via her work at Glasgow Citizens' Theatre, Baxendale was cast in hospital TV series Cardiac Arrest, though it was not her first television role. Her performance as Dr Claire Maitland earned her a Scottish BAFTA nomination in 1995. Her role as Rachel Bradley in the TV series Cold Feet garnered her a British Comedy Award nomination. She starred in An Unsuitable Job for a Woman, playing Cordelia Gray. The Independent stated: "her early roles were defined by icy cool, sleek bobs and ironic detachment."

Aged 27 Baxendale was cast in a recurring role in Friends as Ross Geller's girlfriend, wife and ultimately ex-wife Emily Waltham. She appeared in fourteen episodes throughout Season 4 and early Season 5. Speaking to The Independent in 2022, Baxendale said I saw those people in Friends, for example, and thought: I don’t think that life is really what I want. They were hounded. They weren’t able to walk into a supermarket and buy something.... (On the attention she received for being in Friends) This thing… this programme that I happened to be in for a few episodes. The whole thing was bonkers. 

Other notable roles include Lorna Johnson in Truth or Dare alongside John Hannah, Caroline Meagher in The Investigator alongside Laura Fraser, and Julie Matthews in Curt Truninger's Dead by Monday. She was nominated for another Scottish BAFTA in 1997 for her role as Lorna Johnson. Dead by Monday won the Angel Award for Best Film at the Monaco International Film Festival in 2003 and the Portland Festival of World Cinema award for best feature film in 2001. She played Pandora Braithwaite in Adrian Mole: The Cappuccino Years in 2001 and "Maggie" in the multiple award-winning Bolse Vita. She appeared in Saving Nellie, a physics programme running on Teachers TV. From 2007 to January 2008 she starred in Swimming with Sharks alongside Christian Slater at London's Vaudeville Theatre.

In 2010, Baxendale appeared in the pilot episode of Dirk Gently as Susan Harmison.  In January 2011, she co-starred with Trevor Eve in the three-part ITV drama Kidnap and Ransom, filmed on location in South Africa. Later in 2011, she starred as DCI Marion Bettany in Val McDermid's radio crime drama Village SOS. In 2012 she reprised her role in the second episode. She then appeared in the Inspector George Gently episode "The Lost Child" alongside Mark Gatiss. From 2012 to 2019, she starred in Cuckoo as Lorna, the mother in-law of the titular Dale 'Cuckoo' Ashbrick. In 2020 she played housekeeper Meggie McGregor in Noughts + Crosses.

Stage
Baxendale starred as Christine in Patrick Marber's After Miss Julie, and in 2005 appeared as Romy, the title role in The Woman Before at the Royal Court alongside Nigel Lindsay, Saskia Reeves, Tom Riley and Georgia Taylor. She played Ophelia in Hamlet (the Marovitz Hamlet) alongside Henry Ian Cusick. She was nominated for an Ian Charleson Award (best classical actor under 30) for her 1993 performance in Soldiers at the Glasgow Citizens Theatre. In 2009 Baxendale played Lara in Amongst Friends alongside Aden Gillett and Emma Cunniffe at Hampstead Theatre.

Radio
In 2008, Baxendale guest starred in episode three of the award winning BBC radio comedy Cabin Pressure.

Personal life
Baxendale has been with her boyfriend David L. Williams since her Glasgow days. Together they have three children. Her first pregnancy was written into An Unsuitable Job for a Woman and her second was written into the fourth series of Cold Feet. Baxendale's oldest child is the actress Nell Williams.

Due to Baxendale's first pregnancy, and the fact that she lived in the UK rather than the US, her character was written out of Friends earlier than the writers had originally intended. She appeared in only 14 episodes, despite her character dating, marrying, and divorcing Ross Geller (David Schwimmer), one of the show's six leads.

Filmography

References

External links

1970 births
Living people
People from Shenstone, Staffordshire
Alumni of Bristol Old Vic Theatre School
English film actresses
English stage actresses
English television actresses
Actors from Pontefract
20th-century English actresses
21st-century English actresses
People educated at the Elmhurst School for Dance
People educated at King Edward VI School, Lichfield
Actors from Staffordshire
Actresses from Yorkshire
Actors from Wakefield